The 26th Satellite Awards is an award ceremony honoring the year's outstanding performers, films and television shows, presented by the International Press Academy.

The nominations were announced on December 1, 2021. The winners were announced on April 2, 2022.

Special achievement awards
Auteur Award (for singular vision and unique artistic control over the elements of production) – Lin-Manuel Miranda

Honorary Satellite Award – Jenifer Lewis

Humanitarian Award (for making a difference in the lives of those in the artistic community and beyond) – Val Kilmer

Mary Pickford Award (for outstanding artistic contribution to the entertainment industry) – Tom Skerritt

Nikola Tesla Award (for visionary achievement in filmmaking technology) – Joan Collins Carey

Breakthrough Performance Award – Artur Amanaliev (Shambala)

Best First Feature – Halle Berry (Bruised)

Stunt Performance Award – The Suicide Squad

Ensemble: Motion Picture – The Power of the DogEnsemble: Television – Succession''

Motion picture winners and nominees

Winners are listed first and highlighted in bold.

Films with multiple nominations

Films with multiple wins

Television winners and nominees

Winners are listed first and highlighted in bold.

Series with multiple nominations

Series with multiple wins

References

External links
 International Press Academy website

Satellite Awards ceremonies
2021 film awards
2022 in California
2021 television awards
April 2022 events in the United States